La Señora is a popular Spanish television period drama series set in the 1920s, produced by Diagonal TV for Televisión Española that was broadcast on La 1 of Televisión Española from 2008 to 2010.

It was filmed in Asturias, Sepúlveda and Navalcarnero, and viewership exceeded 5 million by the last episode which aired on January 18, 2010.

Plot 
In the 1920s Victoria and Ángel fall in love in a small town, northern Spain. They are two people both from a different social class, she is the daughter of a wealthy businessman and he comes from a poor family. They are so in love but social norms and circumstances of the era force them to break up. Several years later, they meet again, Victoria as a powerful businesswoman and Ángel as a priest.

Spin-offs and adaptations 
In 2011, Televisión Española created another popular series as a spin-off, 14 de abril. La República, which included some of the original characters from La Señora.

References

External links 
 
 La Señora - Dosier (pdf)
 RTVE (Radio Televisión Española Web Oficial de la serie La Señora)
 RTVE (Radio Televisión Española Web Oficial de la serie 14 De abril La República)

Television series set in the 1920s
La 1 (Spanish TV channel) network series
Spanish-language television shows
2010 Spanish television series endings
2000s Spanish drama television series
Television shows filmed in Spain
Television shows set in Asturias
2010s Spanish drama television series
2008 Spanish television series debuts
Television series by Diagonal TV